Social Animals are an American alternative rock band from Duluth, Minnesota. Band members include lyricist and lead vocalist Dedric Clark (vocals, rhythm guitar), Tony Petersen (lead guitar), Boyd Smith (drums), and Roger Whittet (bass).

History 
The band formed in 2012 in Cloquet, a small town near Duluth. "Clark first crossed paths with Petersen thanks to the barely-existent local music scene. 'There were basically two or three people who played music in the whole city, and Tony was one of them. And he happened to be really good,' Clark says. The two next brought Smith into the fold and then found Whittet in a moment of strange serendipity. 'Roger worked at a liquor store, and I went in really hungover one morning, and he was just sitting there playing bass,' Clark recalls. 'I asked if he wanted to join my band, and he said yes and played a show with us that night, and then just never quit'".

In 2014, they relocated to Portland, Oregon to pursue their music career full-time. Over the course of 2014–2015, the band toured across the western United States on self-booked tours. In 2015, the band was signed to Hard 8 Working Group Management by owner Rich Egan. In late 2016 and early 2017, they began recording their debut album with engineer Paul Kolderie (Radiohead, Pixies) in a several studios, including Modest Mouse's Ice Cream Party Studios, where they were aided by Steve Berlin and Chris Carrabba's Deep Deep South . The band is currently based between Minneapolis and Nashville.

The band spent much of 2016-2017 playing a string of festivals including Firefly Music Festival, Summerfest, and others. In 2017 they toured extensively throughout the United States with acts such as The All-American Rejects and Dashboard Confessional. In early November, they celebrated the release of their debut single "Cheer Up Charlie" on Substream Magazine. Substream'''s Joel Funk writes, "The music is pulsing and infectious and works in perfect juxtaposition with the hyper-personal nature of the lyrics and the cynical, sarcastic feeling of the vocal delivery".

In late 2019, the band signed with Rise Records in anticipation of their debut LP. They released their debut track "Bad Things" and followed shortly with "Best Years" over the following months, accompanied by videos directed by Gus Black.

The band toured with Rise Record's label mates Angels & Airwaves. Clash Magazine debuted "Bad Things" as their Track of The Day on November 11, 2019, writing, "There's a certain alienation that runs through Mid Western art; growing up there isn't easy, but neither is leaving. That's where Social Animals come in. Hailing from Duluth, their delicious indie pop has a bittersweet edge, this pang of introversion that makes for something bracing. Literate and intoxicating, it's very much entwined with a certain time, a certain place, while reaching towards the universal at every turn".

 Releases 

 "Cheer Up Charlie" - Single - (2017)"''Bad Things" - Single - (2019)
"Best Years" - Single - (2020) 
"Something To Keep Me Awake" - Single - (2020)

References 

Musical groups from Minnesota